The Olympus Stylus Tough TG-860 is a digital rugged compact camera announced by Olympus on February 5, 2015. It has built-in WiFi and GPS, and is waterproof to a depth of 15m (50 feet), freezeproof to -10 degrees Celsius (14 degrees Fahrenheit), crushproof to a force of 100 kg or 220 pounds. It's also shockproof against drops from up to 2.1m (7 feet) in height.

References
http://www.dpreview.com/products/olympus/compacts/oly_tg860/specifications

Olympus digital cameras
Cameras introduced in 2015